Rugby union in Latvia is a minor but growing sport. During the pre-independence period, Latvia was not a centre for the game but nonetheless  managed to qualify for the 1993 Rugby World Cup Sevens - which may be seen as the highest point it has yet reached.

Governing Body
The Latvian Rugby Federation (Latvian: "Latvijas Regbija Federacija") was founded in 1963, and joined the IRB in 1991, after Latvian independence. Although the union was formed in the sixties, it was not considered a proper national union until after the breakup of the USSR.

History

Soviet Period

Rugby union was played in the Russian Empire as early as in 1908. In 1934 the Moscow Championship was started, and in 1936 the first Soviet Championship took place.

Rugby union arrived in Latvia itself during the post-War Soviet period. Latvia was never a stronghold of rugby in the USSR - the game was mainly played in Russia and Georgia - but has experienced some growth in the post-independence period.

After 1949, rugby's funding was withdrawn in the USSR for the sport being non-olympic". The competitions were resumed in 1957, and the Soviet Championship in 1966. In 1975 the Soviet national team played their first match.

Latvia had its own rugby team in the USSR, but it was not treated as a proper national side.

Post-independence
Like many other minor rugby nations, the game is centred on the capital, Riga.

Latvian rugby received a surprise boost when they qualified for the 1993 Rugby World Cup Sevens. At the time, there were only two pitches in the country, both of which spent much of their time under snow.
 However, they lost heavily to Fiji, Wales, South Africa and Romania.

There is some rivalry with neighbours Lithuania, who they beat in the qualifiers for the 1995 Rugby World Cup, although they did not succeed in getting into the main competition.

The Baltic is not a major rugby playing area at the time of writing, but several neighbouring countries such as Poland, Russia and Sweden can boast thousands of players. The game is also growing fairly fast in Ukraine
. Entry into the European Union will also make it easier for western European sides to tour the country.

Snow rugby is also played in Latvia during the winter when conditions make standard play impossible.

See also
 Latvia national rugby union team
 Latvia national rugby union team (sevens)
 Soviet Union national rugby union team

References

External links
 IRB Latvia page
 Official webpage
 Don't put your tackle in Behind, pictures and anecdotes about Latvian rugby.